The Indiana Uplands AVA is an American Viticultural Area encompassing much of the Indiana Uplands in south-central Indiana. It is bordered to the south and east by the large Ohio River Valley AVA but does not overlap with it. Viticulture began in the region in the 19th century, but disappeared due to Prohibition before beginning to rebound in the 1960s. Oliver Winery, the largest and oldest winery in Indiana, is located within the AVA.

See also
Indiana wine

References

External links
 
 TTB AVA Map

American Viticultural Areas
Indiana wine